Matthew Holmes (born 1 August 1969) is an English former professional footballer who played as a midfielder.

He notably played in the Premier League for West Ham United, Blackburn Rovers and Charlton Athletic. He also played in the Football League for AFC Bournemouth and Cardiff City. In 2000 he went into semi-retirement at the age of 30 due to an injury inflicted by Australian defender Kevin Muscat during an FA Cup game in 1998. He later played at non-league level for Dorchester Town.

Club career
Holmes joined AFC Bournemouth in 1986 where he remained until 1992 when he joined West Ham United. The fee was an initial £40,000 rising to £60,000 on appearances.
Making his debut on 19 August 1992 in a 2–0 away defeat to Newcastle United Holmes was part of the team which won promotion to the Premier League in season 1992–93. Two seasons in the Premier League followed with West Ham before he joined then Premier League champions Blackburn Rovers in August 1995 for a fee of £1.2m. Holmes played only nine games for Blackburn before being signed by manager Alan Curbishley for Charlton Athletic in July 1997. His professional career was ended on 3 February 1998, whilst playing in an FA Cup fourth round replay against Wolverhampton Wanderers. Holmes was fouled by Wolves player Kevin Muscat causing an injury so severe his surgeon told him that he had been fortunate not to have his leg amputated. He underwent a series of operations to repair his injured leg but was unable to return to top-level football. He played only 20 minutes first team football as a substitute in one Cup game in the remaining two and a half years of his contract. In July 2000, Holmes left top-flight professional football and moved to Dorchester Town.

Coaching career
He now runs a coaching school in the Dorset and Hampshire areas, which is aimed at children between the ages of five and twelve, and works for Bournemouth running centre of excellence age groups 6 - 11 and local development centres.

Personal life
He is the nephew of former Middlesbrough, Bolton Wanderers and Arsenal manager Bruce Rioch.

In 2004, Holmes was awarded £250,000 by the English High court for damages resulting from the tackle by Kevin Muscat.

References

External links 
 Matty Holmes School of Coaching

1969 births
Living people
English footballers
Blackburn Rovers F.C. players
West Ham United F.C. players
AFC Bournemouth players
Charlton Athletic F.C. players
Cardiff City F.C. players
Premier League players
Dorchester Town F.C. players
English Football League players
Footballers from Luton
AFC Bournemouth non-playing staff
Association football midfielders
English people of Scottish descent
Association football coaches